Christensen Shipyards is a custom series composite-hull motor yacht builder located in Vancouver, Washington, United States.

Facilities
Founded in 1983, the original yard is located on a  marina, and contains  of climate controlled manufacturing space. Sister company RECS (Renewable Energy Composite Solutions), occupies , manufacturing wind turbine and hydrokinetic composite component fabrication.

Vessels

Hull 026 Privacy
Hull 026 was delivered to golfer Tiger Woods in summer 2006. It was specified by Woods, but owner-checked and with interior colour schemes chosen by his then fiancee Elin Nordegren, the  yacht was registered in the Cayman Islands as Privacy. The $20 million,  vessel features a master suite, six staterooms, a theatre, gym, and Jacuzzi, and sleeps 21 people. During ordering and construction, the yacht was covered by a strict non-disclosure agreement, meaning that details of the yacht specification and owner would not be released. After details leaked to various nautical publications and later gossip columns, Woods successfully sued Christensen, and reached an out of court settlement. Woods used the yacht as accommodation at some golf tournaments, but placed it on the market after his divorce in 2011.

Sea Hunter 

In 2012 Christensen was contracted by Leidos to manufacture the Sea Hunter unmanned surface vessel under the supervision of Oregon Iron Works. When Christensen went into receivership work on the vessel stopped and the incomplete hull had to be transferred to Vigor Industrial (parent of Oregon Iron Works) for completion.

References

Companies based in Vancouver, Washington
American boat builders
Yacht building companies